Bengal is a region in South Asia, politically split between Bangladesh and India. Due to its long history and complicated political divisions, various names have been used to refer to the region and its subsections. The name Bangla is used by both Bangladesh and West Bengal in international contexts. In the Bengali language, the two Bengals each use a different term to refer to the nominally identified nation: Bānglā and Baṅga

Terminology in detail
Geography:
Bengal is a region in Asia located in the eastern part of the Indian subcontinent at the apex of the Bay of Bengal. Geographically it is part of the Ganges-Brahmaputra delta system, the largest river delta system in the world. The region borders the Himalayan states to its north and in the east borders Northeast India and the country of Burma. 
Bangla may be a transliteration of either Bengal (a geographical and ethno-linguistic region in South Asia) or Bengali (an adjective referring to something of, from, or related to Bengal). It can also  refer to the endonym of the region in the Bengali language or the native name of the region.
Bongo is a transliteration of the Bengali name of the region of Bengal as a geographical and ethno-linguistic region in South Asia.
Language:
Bangladesh (Country of the Bengal) was a popular term for the region as a unified country during the Bengali Renaissance, and was used in Bengali patriotic songs and poems like "Namo Namo Namo Bangladesh Momo" (1932) by Kazi Nazrul Islam, who later became the national poet of Bangladesh.  In his patriotic song Aaji Bangladesher Hridoy (1905), the poet Rabindranath Tagore used the word Bangladesh to refer to his motherland. Alternatives to the name Bangladesh are:
Bangadesh (lit. Bengali Country)
Bongobhumi or Banglabhumi (lit. Bengali Land)
Bangarajya or Banglarajya (lit. Bengali Realm)
Bangarashtra or Banglarashtra (lit. Bengali State)
Politics:
East Bengal – The 1947 Partition of Bengal divided the British Indian province of Bengal as part of the formal Partition of India. East Bengal (now Bangladesh), which was predominantly Muslim, became a province of Pakistan. In 1955, East Bengal became the new province of East Pakistan. In 1971, East Pakistan declared Independence during the Liberation War of Bangladesh and the new nation of Bangladesh was formed.
West Bengal – The Partition of Bengal also created West Bengal, a predominantly Hindu province of India. In 2011, the Government of West Bengal proposed a change in the official name of the state to Paschimbongo ( Pôshchimbônggô). This is the native name of the state, literally meaning "West Bengal" in the Bengali language. In 2016, West Bengal Legislative Assembly passed a resolution to change the name of West Bengal to Bengal in English, Bangla in Bengali and Bangal in Hindi. Despite the Trinamool Congress government's efforts to forge a consensus, the Congress, the Left Front, and the Bharatiya Janata Party opposed the resolution and it awaits the consent of the Indian Parliament for approval.
Bangabhumi or Bir Banga – A separatist movement to create a Hindu country in southwestern Bangladesh, envisioned by Banga Sena.
Greater Bangladesh – A political theory circulated by a number of politicians, intellectuals and writers that the People's Republic of Bangladesh has aspirations to unite Bengali-speaking regions into a greater historical Bengal. According to the theory this would include the Indian states of West Bengal, Nagaland, Manipur, Meghalaya, Sikkim, Arunachal Pradesh, Tripura, Assam, Andaman Islands, and the Rakhine State (formerly Arakan/Rohang) in Myanmar (formerly Burma) as part of its own territory with democratic governance.
United Bengal – A proposal that was put forward by Bengali political leaders Huseyn Shaheed Suhrawardy and Sarat Chandra Bose to found a united and independent nation-state of Bengal. The proposal was floated as an alternative to the Partition of Bengal on communal lines.

Geographical distinctions

East Bengal

East Bengal ( Purbô Bangla) was the name used during two different periods in the 20th century for a territory that roughly corresponded to the modern state of Bangladesh. Both instances involved a violent partition of Bengal which made one half East Bengal or Bangladesh.

Historically, it referred to the fertile Bhati region of the Bengal delta, which corresponds to the modern-day Dhaka Division.

North Bengal
North Bengal is a term used for the north-western part of Bangladesh and northern part of West Bengal. The Bangladesh part includes the Rajshahi Division and Rangpur Division. Generally, it is the area lying west of Jamuna River and north of Padma River and includes the Barind Tract. The West Bengal part denotes the Jalpaiguri Division (Alipurduar, Cooch Behar, Darjeeling, Jalpaiguri, North Dinajpur, South Dinajpur and Malda). The Bihar parts include the Kishanganj district. It also includes parts of Darjeeling Hills. Traditionally, the Hooghly River divides West Bengal into South and North Bengal, divided again into Terai and Dooars regions.

South Bengal
South Bengal is a term used for the southwestern part of Bangladesh and the southern part of West Bengal. The Bangladesh part includes the Khulna, Faridpur, and Barisal Divisions. The Bay of Bengal is located at the end of the southern part of Bangladesh. The West Bengal part includes 12 districts in the southern part of West Bengal; Kolkata, Howrah, Hooghly, Burdwan, East Midnapur, West Midnapur, Purulia, Bankura, Birbhum, Nadia, South 24 Parganas and North 24 Parganas.

West Bengal
West Bengal comprises roughly one-third of the ethno-linguistic region of Bengal. When India gained independence in 1947, Bengal was partitioned along religious lines. The western part went to the Dominion of India (and was named West Bengal).

Hilly Bengal
Hilly Bengal (Bengali: পার্বত্যবঙ্গ) is a term used for the southeastern parts of Bangladesh and parts of northern Myanmar. The Bangladesh part consists of Rangamati, Khagrachari and Bandarban, while the Myanmar part consists of 14 districts in the Northern part of Rakhine (Arakan/Rohang): Maungdaw, Buthidaung, Kyaukpyu, Ponnagyan, Rathedaung, Sittwe, Pauktaw, Mrauk-U, Minbya, Myabon, Ann, Kyaukpyu, Rambree and Munaung.

Historical names

Historical names for Bengal include (in chronological order):
 Bonga –  an Austric word for Sun god
 Bang –   a Bronze Age proto-Dravidian tribe
 Vanga – a seafaring state located in the eastern part of the Indian Subcontinent comprising today's politically divided Bengal region (West Bengal, India and Bangladesh)also mentioned in Sanskrit text Mahabharata.
 Vangaladesa – a term found in South Indian records in the 11th century.
 Gauda – a kingdom located in Bengal in ancient and medieval times. The Pala emperors were referred to as Vangapati (Lord of Vanga) and Gaudesvara (Lord of Gauda). Sena kings also called themselves Gaudesvara. From then Gauda and Vanga seem to be interchangeable names for the whole of Bengal.

 Bangala or Shahi Bangala – a sovereign state that encompassed present-day Bangladesh, the Indian state of West Bengal and the Myanmar state of Rakhine between the 14th and 16th centuries. It was a regional power and a melting pot of Muslims, Hindus and Buddhists, located at the crossroads of modern South Asia and Southeast Asia. During the Bengal Sultanate Shamsuddin Ilyas Shah proclaimed himself the first Shah of Bangala in 1342. Bangla became the most-common name for the region during the Islamic period.
 Bengal Subah or Mughal Bengal – a state of the Mughal Empire encompassing modern Bangladesh and the Indian states of West Bengal, Bihar and Orissa between the 16th and 18th centuries. It was established following the dissolution of the Bengal Sultanate. The Mughals played an important role in developing modern Bengali culture and society. By the 18th century, Mughal Bengal had emerged as a quasi-independent state.
 Bengalen or Dutch Bengal – a directorate of the Dutch East India Company in Bengal between 1610 and the company's liquidation in 1800.
 Bengal Presidency – the largest colonial subdivision (presidency) of British India, with its seat in Calcutta, the capital of British-held territories in South Asia until 1911. At its territorial peak in the 19th century, the presidency extended from the present-day Khyber Pakhtunkhwa province of Pakistan in the west to Burma, Singapore and Penang in the east. The Governor of Bengal was concurrently the Viceroy of India for many years. Most of the presidency's territories were eventually incorporated into other British Indian provinces and crown colonies.
In 1905, the Presidency was partitioned into:
 Bengal – including present Bihar, Jharkhand and Odisha, headquartered in Calcutta 
 Eastern Bengal and Assam – headquartered in Dacca and Shillong (summer capital). 
British India was reorganized in 1912 and the presidency was reunited into a single Bengali-speaking province. The 1947 Partition of British India resulted in Bengal's division on religious grounds, between:
West Bengal – to be renamed as Banga Pradesh in par/aligned with other Indian states respectively.
East Bengal, renamed East Pakistan in 1955
Bangladesh – East Bengal, which became a province of Pakistan according to the provisions set forth in the Mountbatten Plan, later became the independent country of Bangladesh after the 1971 Bangladesh Liberation War.

Adjectives
Bangla – the contents and attributes of the Bengali language or the country of Bangladesh.
Bengali – the contents and attributes of Bengal.
Bangiya – an adjectival prefix referring to Bengal particularly in the field of literature, e.g. Bangiya Sahitya Parishad, Bangiya Gramin Vikash Bank and Bangiya Janata Dal. Can be synonymous with Bengali.
Bengalese – something of, from, or related to Bengal.
Bangalee – until 1978 the Constitution of Bangladesh referred all citizens of Bangladesh as Bangalees, an archaic spelling for Bengali.
Bangladeshi – from 1978 this was a widely used term to refer to the citizens of Bangladesh.
Bangal (Hindustani: बंगाल) – used informally in India to refer to Bangladeshis. Bangal is also the Hindustani word for Bengal. In West Bengal, the term is widely used among upper-class subgroups to differentiate families from Bangladesh.
Bangabasi – peoples of Bengal.
Bangadesiya – something of, from, or related to Bengal or Bengalis.
Banga-Santan – lit: Son/ child  of Mother Bengal- an adjectival prefix referring to People of Bengal or Bengalis.
Banga-Lalana – lit: Daughter of Mother Bengal- an adjectival prefix referring to a girl/lady of Bengal or any Female Bengalis.
Bong- an Indian slang used to refer anyone from West Bengal.

Other names
Bengali: গঙ্গাহৃদ/ গঙ্গাঋদ্ধি/ গঙ্গারাষ্ট্র; Gangarid / Gangaridai / Ganga Rashtra – meaning Heart of Ganges / Wealth of Ganges / Nation on the River Ganges
Bengali: গৌড় রাজ্য; Gauṛa rajya — Gauda Kingdom; meaning radiant kingdom (from Sanskrit गौड़ gauṛa "white, radiant, fair, golden", rājya, राज्य "kingdom, state"). Bengal is described in ancient Sanskrit texts as 'Gaud-Desh'. 
Arabic: رحمة; Rahma — meaning Land of Mercy
Chinese:;

Sobriquets for Bengal
In traditional Bengali culture, as well as in the Bengali Media, the land of Bengal has assumed a number of sobriquets over the centuries, including:

Sonar Bangla; Golden Bengal
Rūpasī Bangla; Beautiful Bengal
Shayamal Bangla; Green Bengal
Epar Bangla; Bengal Here, used by Bengalis for their Native Bengal.
Opar Bangla; Bengal There, used by Bengalis for other part of Bengal.
Bharatiya Bangla; Indian Bengal, used by Bangladeshi media for Indian state of West Bengal.
Padmapar; Bank of River Padma, used by Indian Bengali media for Republic Bangladesh.
Nadimatrik Desh; Riverine country or the Country of the River, used for Bangladesh.
Hazar Nodir Desh; the Country of the Thousand Rivers, used for Bengal.
 Chhay Ritur Desh; the Country of the Six Seasons, used for Bangladesh.

See also
Bangla
Bangamata

References

History of Bengal
History of India
Bangladesh
Bengal